Perfect Vision is the eighth solo album by Thalia Zedek, released on August 27, 2021, three years after Fighting Season.

Background
Released by Thrill Jockey on August 27, 2021, three years after her previous solo album Fighting Season, Perfect Vision was recorded in late 2020 to early 2021 at Machines with Magnets, in Pawtucket, Rhode Island. Zedek's fifth solo album to be credited to the Thalia Zedek Band, Perfect Vision was recorded and mixed by producer Seth Manchester and mastered by Sarah Register.
 
Whilst the material in Zedek's previous album Fighting Season "was written leading up to and following the 2016 U.S. elections", which contributed to the political themes of many of its songs, Zedek and Manchester finished working on Perfect Vision on January 6, 2021, as the United States Capitol in Washington, D.C. was being violently attacked by a mob of supporters of President Donald Trump, resulting again in an album that is at points not only overtly political but one that, as Jared Dix reviewing it for Echoes and Dust states, "may even be angrier than the last album, Fighting Season".

"Tolls" features fellow Thrill Jockey artist Alison Chesley, also known as Helen Money, on cello and piano.

Critical reception

On Metacritic, the album has a weighted average score of 71 out of 100, based on four critics, indicating "generally favorable reviews". 

Jennifer Kelly, in her review of the album for Dusted magazine, declared that Perfect Vision, "[l]ike all [of Zedek's] works, [...] exudes a brute, persistent strength that will not yield, no matter what happens". Kelly then went on to state that "[the] album presents an artist who has had all the time life affords to figure out how she wants to sound and all the support that long-time collaborators can bring to realizing her ideas. Every sound fits, without sounding in the least bit fussed over or premeditated." AllMusic's review of the album, penned by Mark Deming, suggested that "[e]ven more than Fighting Season, Perfect Vision is art that offers a hard but honest look at the world and the times that gave it life, and its evocative power will still speak clearly long after other crises have replaced those keeping Zedek awake in 2021."

Track listing

Personnel 
Thalia Zedek Band
 Thalia Zedek – electric guitars, vocals
 Winston Braman – bass guitar
 David Michael Curry – viola
 Gavin McCarthy – drums

Additional musicians
 Mel Lederman – piano on "Binoculars"
 Brian Carpenter – trumpet on "From the Fire"
 Karen Sarkisian – pedal steel guitar on "Cranes"
 Alison Chesley – cello and piano on "Smoked" and "Tolls"

Production
 Thalia Zedek – front cover photo
 Heather Kapplow – back cover photo
 Dan Zedek – design
 Seth Manchester – recording and mixing
 Sarah Register – mastering

References 

Thalia Zedek albums
Blues rock albums by American artists
2021 albums